Kvaløya Sportsklubb is a Norwegian sports club from Kvaløya, Tromsø. It has sections for association football and team handball.

It was established on 29 April 2010 as a merger of Kvaløysletta IL (founded 1970) and the smaller Slettaelva SK (founded 1992).

The men's football team currently plays in the Fourth Division, the fifth tier of Norwegian football. Kvaløysletta played in the Third Division in 1992–1994, 2000–2002, 2005 and 2007–2008.

References

 Official site 

Football clubs in Norway
Sport in Troms og Finnmark
Sport in Tromsø
Association football clubs established in 2010
2010 establishments in Norway